The Boston Society of Film Critics has presented an annual Award for Best New Filmmaker since 1996; the recipients of the inaugural prize were Campbell Scott and Stanley Tucci, co-directors of Big Night.

1990s

2000s

2010s

2020s

External links

References

Boston Society of Film Critics Awards
Directorial debut film awards
Awards established in 1996